2030 – Aufstand der Jungen is a German film directed by . It was released in 2010.

External links
 

2010 films
German science fiction films
2010s German-language films
2010s German films
German dystopian films